Seven Miles from Alcatraz is a 1942 American action film directed by Edward Dmytryk. The screenplay concerns two prisoners who break out of Alcatraz Federal Penitentiary.

Plot
During World War II, two prisoners break out of Alcatraz Federal Penitentiary, only to encounter German spies.

Cast
 James Craig as Champ Larkin
 Bonita Granville as Anne Porter
 Frank Jenks as Jimbo
 Cliff Edwards as Stormy
 George Cleveland as Captain Porter
 Erford Gage as Paul Brenner
 Tala Birell as Baroness
 John Banner as Fritz Weinermann
 Otto Reichow as Max

References

External links
 
 
 
 

1942 films
1940s action films
American action films
American spy films
American black-and-white films
Films directed by Edward Dmytryk
World War II spy films
Alcatraz Island in fiction
RKO Pictures films
1940s English-language films
1940s American films